Birgit is a female given name, a short form of Birgitta and ultimately a Germanic form of the Gaelic name Bridget. Notable people with the name include:

 Birgit Brüel, Danish singer and actress
 Birgit Collin-Langen, German politician
 Birgit Cunningham, Anglo-American activist 
 Birgit Doll, Austrian actress and theatre director
 Birgit Finnilä, Swedish opera singer
 Birgit Fischer, German canoer
 Birgit Friedmann (born 1960), German runner and 1980 world champion
 Birgit Hogefeld, German RAF terrorist member
 Birgit Kähler, German high jumper
 Birgit Meyer (born 1960), Dutch religious studies scholar
 Birgit Michels, German badminton player
 Birgit Minichmayr, Austrian actress
 Birgit Nilsson, Swedish soprano 
 Birgit Õigemeel, Estonian singer
 Birgit Prinz, German football (soccer) player
 Birgit Püve, Estonian photographer
 Birgit Rausing, Swedish art historian
 Birgit Ridderstedt, Swedish singer
 Birgit Schrowange, German television presenter 
 Birgit Schuurman, Dutch rock singer
 Birgit Thumm, German volleyball player
 Birgit Vogel-Heuser (born 1961), German computer scientist
 Birgit Zotz, Austrian writer and anthropologist

See also
 960 Birgit, a minor planet orbiting the Sun
 Birgit language
 Brigid (disambiguation)

Danish feminine given names
Estonian feminine given names
German feminine given names
Norwegian feminine given names
Swedish feminine given names
Scandinavian feminine given names